A retroflex fricative is a fricative consonant produced in the retroflex place of articulation. The International Phonetic Alphabet has dedicated symbols for the following retroflex fricatives:
Voiceless retroflex fricative, 
Voiced retroflex fricative, 

Fricative consonants
Retroflex consonants